Frederick Jean Gloden Jr. (December 21, 1918 – February 25, 2019) was an American football halfback who played one season with the Philadelphia Eagles of the National Football League. He played college football at Tulane University and attended Dubuque Senior High School in Dubuque, Iowa. He was also a member of the Miami Seahawks of the All-America Football Conference. Gloden served in the United States Navy during World War II. Prior to his death, Gloden was the second oldest living former NFL player, after Jack Smith.

In the week leading up to Super Bowl LII, Gloden, age 99, was interviewed by NBC 10 in Philadelphia where he made the prediction that the Eagles would beat the New England Patriots by six points. The story was also picked up by the NFL. He died in February 2019 at the age of 100.

References

External links
Just Sports Stats
Encyclopedia Dubuque

1918 births
2019 deaths
American centenarians
American football halfbacks
Men centenarians
Miami Seahawks players
Philadelphia Eagles players
Players of American football from Iowa
Sportspeople from Dubuque, Iowa
Tulane Green Wave football players
United States Navy personnel of World War II